Ronne Hartfield (née Ronola Rone, born Ronola 17, 1936) is an author, essayist, international museum consultant, and a former senior executive at The Art Institute of Chicago and Executive Director of Urban Gateways: The Center for Arts in Education. She has been a co-chair of the Harvard University Arts Education Council and a Senior Research Associate at Harvard University's Center for the Study of World Religions and Claremont Graduate University School of Religion. In 2004, Hartfield published Another Way Home: The Tangled Roots of Race in One Chicago Family.  Hartfield has served on the board of directors at the American Writers Museum, the Frank Lloyd Wright Foundation in Taliesin, Scottsdale, Arizona, the Rhode Island School of Design, and the Institute for the Advanced Study of Religion at the University of Chicago. She is an internationally recognized expert in arts education and multicultural education.  Ronne's husband, Robert Hartfield, is a mathematician at the University of Chicago. They have four daughters.

Early life and education 

Ronne Hartfield was born on March 17, 1936, to John Drayton Rone Sr. and Thelma Shepherd (née Thelma Day), a factory-worker and a homemaker. Her parents emigrated separately from Louisiana to Chicago during the “first wave” of the Great Migration, between 1918 and 1920. Hartfield and her four siblings all attended the landmark Wendell Phillips High School and local universities.

Ronne attended the University of Chicago for both her undergraduate and master's degree. While obtaining her BA in History (1955), Ronne worked with Honors preceptorial advisor Charles G. Bell. Advisors for her M.A. in Theology and Literature included Langdon Gilkey, Paul Ricoeur and Anthony Yu.

She was awarded an Honorary Doctorate in Humane Letters by DePaul University in 2006.

Early career 
From 1974 to 1981, Hartfield served as the Dean of Students and Assistant Professor of the Comparative Literature at the School of the Art Institute of Chicago. During this time, Hartfield developed national and international exchange study opportunities and fellowships for SAIC students. In 1981, Hartfield became the Executive Director for Urban Gateways: The Center for Arts in Education, a Chicago-based, not-for-profit, arts and education organization that was at the time the largest in the country. Urban Gateways won the Presidential Medal for the Arts, as well as the Governor's Award for the most outstanding arts organization in Illinois. 

In 1991, Hartfield became the Woman's Board Endowed Executive Director of Museum Education at The Art Institute of Chicago where she was responsible for all facets of interpretation in the museum, including lectures, film, videos and services to schools and families. Hartfield was instrumental in forming the Leadership Advisory Committee in 1994. The LAC continues to promote and sustain diversity within the AIC, and provides counsel, new perspectives and support to the museum for the advancement and engagement of African Americans in the life of the institution. 

From 1999 to the present, Hartfield has been an independent consultant in museum education and planning. Her clients have included The Fetzer Institute, where she convened an international Arts Advisory Council; The Museum of Contemporary Art, Chicago; Rubin Museum of Art, New York City; Museum of Biblical Art, New York City; Harvard University Center for the Study of World Religions at Harvard Divinity School; National Endowment for the Arts; Newberry Library; as well as museums in São Paulo, London and Kyoto.

Author 
Hartfield's full-length memoir, Another Way Home: The Tangled Roots of Race in One Chicago Family (University of Chicago Press, 2004) was a seminal book in the literature of race in America. A biographical memoir, Another Way Home traces the story of Hartfield's mother, Day Shepherd, through her migration to the city of Chicago and her experiences as a mixed-race American. Hartfield draws on her mother's recollections and genealogical research to trace her family roots from a deep-South plantation to a close-knit urban middle-class family. Hartfield's book chronicles crucial moments in African American history, from the Chicago Race Riot of 1919 and the Great Depression to the murder of Emmett Till and the dawn of the Civil Rights Movement. Named by the ''Chicago Tribune as one of the ten best non-fiction books of 2004, Another Way Home has met with critical acclaim, and garnered  praise from Children's Defense Fund President Marian Wright Edelman, Yale Professor Robert B. Stepto, Harvard's Sara Lawrence Lightfoot, and poet Nikki Giovanni.

Selected service on boards and committees 
 American Writers Museum, Chicago, Vice Chair, Board of Directors, 
 Fetzer Institute, Kalamazoo, MI, Convener, Arts Advisory Council
 Frank Lloyd Wright Foundation, Taliesin, Scottsdale, AZ, Board of Directors
 Harvard University Graduate Division of Arts Education, Co-Chair Board of Directors
 University of Chicago Women's Board, Steering Committee
 University of Chicago, Interlocutor, International Enhancing Life Project
 Institute for the Advanced Study of Religion, Martin Marty Center,University of Chicago
 Rhode Island School of Design, Honorary Life Trustee
 Gaylord and Dorothy Donnelley Foundation, Chicago
 The Chicago Network, Vice President
 Columbia College Chicago, Board of Directors
 International Sculpture Center, New York City
 National Museum of Women in the Arts, Illinois Chapter
 National Women's Caucus for Art
 ArtTable, New York City, Vice President

Selected publications
 2019 - Essay in The Horn Book Magazine,v. XCV No. 4, American Library Association
 2016 - The Arts Enhance Life in Excelsis: Essay, websites of The University of Chicago Enhancing Life Project and the Chicago Symphony Orchestra 
 2014 - Essay in Conference Publication, the Institute for Signifying Scriptures, Claremont, California 
 2013 - Manifest Grace: Art, Presence, and Healing: Catalogue Essay in Body and Soul, Museum of Art and Design: New York City 
 2012 - Visual Echoes and Evocations: Essay in Eranos Yearbook v.70. Daimon Verlag, Einsiedein, Ticino, Italy.
 2010 - Journal of Ordinary Thought, Neighborhood Writing Alliance, Chicago.Introuction.
 2010 - Foreword: Catalogue for SAIC/SSCAC exhibition, RECESSION.   
 2007 - Architects of Culture. Interview with Tim Gilfoyle in Chicago History, the Magazine of the Chicago History Museum.  Summer issue
 2006 - Laying Coping Stones in Zion: Art, the Imagination, and the Flourishing of Common Life. Essay in Criterion (University of Chicago Divinity School v.45 No. 1)
 2004 - Another Way Home: The Tangled Roots of Race in One Chicago Family. Biographical Memoir (University of Chicago Press)
 2004 - Musings on Barbarous Beauty. Fellowship conference proceedings (Harvard University Center for the Study of World Religions)
 2004 - Seeing and Silence: Sacred Encounter in Museum Exhibition. Essay in Stewards of the Sacred (American Association of Museums)
 2004 - The Encyclopedia of Chicago History (University of Chicago Press). Two entries
 2001 - Encountering Art/Different Facets of the Esthetic Experience. Miho Museum, Kyoto. Essay (Overlook Press NY)
 2001 - A Permanence of Stone and Language in America's Courtyard. Catalog essay: Perez and Milan. (Ripasa, São Paulo)
 1998 - The New Jersey State Museum, African American Fine Arts Collection Catalog, Trenton. Five essays
 1996 - The Chicago Years: Gathering Light in the Gray City. Essay in Gullah Images: The Art of Jonathan Green (University of South Carolina Press)
 1995 - The Artist in Society: Afterword. Essay in New Art Examiner, Summer
 1995 - Turning the Museum Inside Out.  Essay in The Journal of Arts Education, September
 1995 - Birmingham Museum of Art, Fall Catalog. Essay for museum installation by sculptor Lorenzo Pace
 1994 - Challenging the Context: Perception, Polity and Power. Essay in Curator: The Museum Journal, v. 37 No. 1
 1993 - Teaching Theater. Keynote Speech. The Journal of the American Educational Theater Association, New York
 1988 - An Unquiet Revolution. Essay in The Journal of Arts Management, Spring
 1985 - Gifts of Power/The Writings of Rebecca Jackson. Book Review in The Journal of Religion, v. 65, No. 2 April

Honors and awards
 Urban Gateways Inaugural Jessie Woods Arts Champion Award for Arts Advocacy
 Harvard University Senior Research Fellowship, Center for the Study of World Religions
 Rockefeller Foundation Bellagio Residency Fellowship
 DePaul University, Doctorate in Humane Letters
 Aspen Institute Residency Fellowships
 Robert Maynard Hutchins Award for Distinction in Education (Chicago History Museum)
 National Women's Caucus for the Arts, Lifetime Achievement Award
 Hull House Women of Valor Award
 University of Chicago Alumni Award for Public Service
 Goethe-Institut Travel Fellowship to Germany
 Brazil Cultural Consortium Travel Fellowship
 Mexico/Chicago Fellowship, City of Chicago Leadership Committee
 Institute for International Education, Women Leaders Delegation to Japan
 YWCA Outstanding Leadership in the Arts Award
 Congressman Sidney Yates Award for Outstanding Contributions to the Arts
 Scholarship and Guidance Association Award for Exceptional Community Service
 American Women Composers Award
 Lawyers For the Creative Arts Award for Exceptional Contributions
 International Women Associates, Woman Extraordinaire
 Christopher Moore Award, Chicago Children's Choir
 Woman of the Year, Chicago Association of Mannequins
 Distinguished Service Award, Alpha Gamma Pi Honorary Sorority
 Community Leadership Award, Abraham Lincoln Center
 Professional Excellence Award, League of Black Women
 Kizzy Award for Exceptional Achievement
 Named One of Ten Chicagoans to Watch by The Chicago Sun-Times
 Named One of 100 Most Outstanding Chicago Women by Today's Chicago Woman
 National Museum of Mexican Art: Sor Juana Award for Lifetime Achievement in the Arts
 African American Arts Alliance of Chicago: Outstanding Achievement in Non-Fiction Literature

References

1936 births
Living people
American essayists
University of Chicago alumni
American memoirists
American women memoirists
American women essayists
21st-century American women